The Alliance for Democracy and Federation (Alliance pour la Démocratie et la Fédération) is a liberal party in Burkina Faso. It is part of the Alliance for Democracy and Federation-African Democratic Rally (Alliance pour la Démocratie et la Fédération-Rassemblement Démocratique Africain), the largest opposition party in the country.

See also
Liberal democracy
Liberalism by country

Liberal parties in Africa
Political parties in Burkina Faso
Political parties with year of establishment missing